Winifred is a feminine given name, an anglicization of Welsh Gwenffrewi, from gwen, "fair", and ffrew, "stillness". It may refer to:

People
 Saint Winifred
 Winifred Atwell (1914–1983), a pianist who enjoyed great popularity in Britain in the 1950s with a series of boogie woogie and ragtime hits
 Winifred Mitchell Baker (born 1957), better known simply as Mitchell Baker, the "Chief Lizard Wrangler" and the President of the Mozilla Corporation
 Winifred, Countess of Dundonald, wife of Douglas Cochrane, 12th Earl of Dundonald
 Winifred Brunton (1880-1959), a painter from South Africa most famous for her haunting portraits of Egyptian pharaohs
 Winifred Cavendish-Bentinck, Duchess of Portland (née Dallas-Yorke;  1863–1954), wife of William Cavendish-Bentinck, 6th Duke of Portland
 Winifred Copperwheat (19051976), English violist
Winifred Starr Dobyns (18861963), American suffragist and landscape designer
 Dr. Winifred Margaret 'Winnie' Ewing (born 1929), commonly known as Winnie Ewing, a prominent Scottish National Party (SNP) politician
 Winifred Greenwood, American silent film actress
 Winifred G. Helmes, American academic
 Winifred Herbert (1680–1749), best known for arranging the daring escape of her husband from the Tower of London in 1716
 Winifred Holtby (1898–1935), an English novelist and journalist
 Winifred Jordan (née Jeffrey; born 1920), an English athlete who competed in the 1938 British Empire Games and the 1948 Summer Olympics
Lady Winifred Kamit, Papua New Guinean lawyer
 Winifred Lamb (1894-1963, an English archaeologist of the early 20th century
 Winifred Lawson (1892-1961), an English opera and concert singer
 Winifred Lewellin James (1876–1941), an Australian writer
 Winifred Mary Letts (1882–1972), an English writer, with strong Irish connections, known for her novels, plays and poetry
Winifred W. Logan (1931-) was a British Nurse theorist who was co-author of the Roper-Logan-Tierney model of nursing
 Winifred Edgerton Merrill (1862–1951), the first American female to receive a PhD in mathematics
 Winifred Nicholson (1893–1981), a painter
 Winifred Rushforth (1885–1983), a Jungian psychoanalyst
 Winifred Spooner (1900–1933), an aviator of the 1920s and 1930s
 Winifred, Lady Strickland (1645–1725), English courtier, member of the Jacobite court in exile
 Winifred Ann Taylor, Baroness Taylor of Bolton (born 1947), a politician
 Winifred Todhunter (1877–1961), the founder of the Todhunter School for girls
 Winifred Tumim (1936–2009), English charity administrator
 Winifred "Freda" Utley (1898-1978), English scholar, political activist and best-selling author
 Winifred Wagner (1897–1980), head of the Wagner family from 1930 to 1945 and a close friend of German dictator Adolf Hitler
 Winifred Ward (1884–1975), a professor at Northwestern College most notable for having done significant work in the field of children's theatre
 Winifred Mary Ward (1884–1975), one of the founders of modern speech therapy
 Winifred "Winnie" Mandela (born 1936), former wife of South Africa's first black president Nelson Mandela

Places
 Winifred, Montana, a town in the United States
 Winifred Beach, a beach in Jamaica

Fictional characters
 Dora-Winifred "D.W." Read, a character from the animated series Arthur
 Winifred Banks (Mrs. Banks), a character from Mary Poppins who appears as a suffragette in the 1964 Disney film and as a fashionable housewife in the Broadway musical
 Winifred Burkle, known as "Fred", a main character in the 1999 television series Angel
 Winifred "Winnie" Sanderson, the main antagonist in the 1993 film Hocus Pocus
 Winifred "Winnie" Foster, a main character from the American book and movie Tuck Everlasting
 Winifred "Wendy" Torrance, a main character from the American book and movie The Shining
Winifred Brooks, a character in the TV series “A Different World”
Winifred "Fred" Grant a character voiced by Joey King in the Disney Channel animated series "Hamster and Gretel"

Ships
 , a Uganda Railway Lake Victoria ferry scuttled in 1936
 , a United States Navy tanker and cargo ship in commission from 1918 to 1919

See also
Winifreda
Winnifred

English feminine given names